St John Ambulance Western Australia (St John WA) is a non-profit, charitable organisation providing first aid services and training, urgent care, patient transport, ambulance and other medical services in Western Australia. It has provided the ambulance service in Western Australia since 1922. These services are provided through a combination of paid and volunteer staff. St John WA is funded through a combination of government funding, Lotterywest grants, corporate and private donations and user pays services.

Western Australia and the Northern Territory are the only two states or territories in Australia which do not have ambulance services provided by government agencies. Neither are these services in those two regulated by legislation.

Vehicles 
As of 2017, St John WA has a fleet of 531 ambulance vehicles and 217 other vehicles:

 Ambulance – Mercedes Benz Sprinter (various specifications, including 44), Toyota Land Cruiser Troop Carrier (regional only), Ford F 150/250 (past use).
 Paramedic/Command – Subaru Forester, Holden Colorado 7/Trailblazer, Toyota Land Cruiser 100/200, Ford Ranger (regional), Ford Falcon (still some regional use, older models).
 First Aid – Mercedes Benz Sprinter (first aid post/event management), Suzuki APV (previously Carry/Holden Scurry), Holden Colorado, Nissan Pathfinder, Hyundai I40.
 Support and Transfer – Mercedes Benz Sprinter (logistics and transfer), Toyota HiAce (wheelchair patients), MAN truck (multiple patient vehicle), Isuzu N Series (incident support vehicles and command post).
 Helicopters – Aeromedical role is offered by RAC Rescue with two Bell 412's based out of Perth and Bunbury.

Uniform 
Previous uniforms were the traditional white shirts with khaki tunics and pants with black epaulettes. The high collar tunic was replaced with a soft collar and black tie. A khaki peaked cap, which in later years became a white topped peaked cap, were replaced during the 1970s with blue trousers and a white smock for summer uniform, along with a white skivvy and blue jacket for winter. In 1981 the uniforms changed to blue trousers, blue shirt and a blue jacket with tie for winter. In 1983 a padded winter jacket with reflective stripes replaced the blue jacket. Ties were discontinued at that time as they were impractical in the field. In 1995 a light green shirt, teamed with dark green pants and jacket was introduced. In the late 2000s the uniforms were upgraded to the new style of all over, utility suit. These consist of a black undershirt with dark green shirt, jacket and pants with reflective stripes. Rescue helmets are utilised in certain situations along with high visibility vests with officer rank visible.

Incidents 
In July 2009, the ABC's Four Corners broadcast a report identifying failures in St John's call-out system, specifically the failure of call centre operators to appropriately prioritise and respond ambulances. The program identified four deaths in which dispatch and prioritisation errors were involved. The WA Health Minister, Dr Kim Hames, has since promised to review "reports of significant wrongdoing, and see if it is correct" in order to prevent recurrence of such events.

On 24 March 2015, the ABC's 7.30 reported on poor management and culture within St John in Western Australia which led an ambulance officer to commit suicide.

St John First Responder app 
The St John First Responder app was designed for use in Western Australia and allows users to send their GPS coordinates to emergency service call centres when dialing 000. The app also provides an in-built first aid guide, automated external defibrillator locator, first aid tips and more. Over 200,000 Western Australians have downloaded the app. Registered first responders must have current cardiopulmonary resuscitation certification and completed a first aid course within the last three years to be approved on the platform.

References

External links 

Ambulance services in Australia
Emergency services in Western Australia
St John Ambulance
Medical and health organisations based in Western Australia